Miroslav Pavelec (19 November 1927 in Městec Králové - 11 February 2019) was a Czechoslovak sprint canoer who competed in the early 1960s. At the 1960 Summer Olympics in Rome, he was disqualified in the heats of the K-1 4 × 500 m event.

Pavelec was a founding member of the Lokomotiva Nymburk speed canoeing club. He won the title of Champion of the Czechoslovak Republic and, as well as the Olympics in Rome, completed in several world championships.

References
Miroslav Pavelec's profile at Sports Reference.com

1927 births
2019 deaths
Canoeists at the 1960 Summer Olympics
Czechoslovak male canoeists
Olympic canoeists of Czechoslovakia
People from Městec Králové
Sportspeople from the Central Bohemian Region